Tyler Pounds Regional Airport  is a city-owned, public-use airport located  west of Tyler, in Smith County, Texas, United States.

The National Plan of Integrated Airport Systems for 2011–2015 called it a "primary commercial service" airport. Federal Aviation Administration records show 76,168 passenger boardings (enplanements) in calendar year 2008, 73,841 in 2009, and 74,357 in 2010.

The airport has been expanding to meet goals in the Tyler Master Plan; on August 17, 2002, the airport opened a new terminal building, doubling its space. Tyler is a large center for general aviation, with three public parking lots for general aviation.

History
 see: Pounds Army Airfield for its World War II use
The airport opened in November 1929 as Tyler Municipal Airport. During World War II, the airfield was used by the United States Army Air Forces as a training base and renamed Pounds Field after Lieutenant Jack Windham Pounds.  At the end of the war, the airfield was turned over to local government for civil use and became Tyler Pounds Regional Airport.

Past airline service

Airline service began in the 1930s. Tyler was listed in Delta Air Lines timetables by 1936 on a Dallas-Atlanta multi-stop route via Shreveport and other stops. In 1952, Delta Douglas DC-3s flew Fort Worth – Dallas – Tyler – Longview – Shreveport – Monroe – Jackson – Meridian – Selma – Montgomery – Columbus – Atlanta as well as Atlanta – Columbus – Montgomery – Meridian – Hattiesburg – New Orleans – Baton Rouge – Alexandria – Shreveport – Tyler – Dallas – Fort Worth. Delta had competition to Dallas Love Field: Trans-Texas Airways DC-3s. Delta left Tyler in 1956.

Trans-Texas Airways (TTa) began serving Tyler in the 1940s; its Douglas DC-3s flew between Dallas Love Field, Beaumont/Port Arthur, and Houston Hobby Airport.  In 1952, TTa flew three DC-3s a day to Beaumont/Port Arthur via Lufkin, Palestine, and Nacogdoches, with one flight continuing on to Galveston and Houston. Convair 240 propeller aircraft and then Convair 600 turboprops later took over.  In 1966, TTa Convair 240s and DC-3s flew nonstop to Dallas, while Convair 240s flew direct to Houston and New Orleans.  By 1968 TTa had begun Convair 600 turboprop flights at Tyler.

Trans-Texas changed its name to Texas International Airlines (TI); in 1970, TI Convair 600s and Beechcraft 99 turboprops flew nonstop to Dallas with direct Convair 600 service to Memphis and New Orleans.  Also in 1970, commuter air carrier Air Texas was operating nonstop Beechcraft 99 service between the airport and Austin (AUS), Dallas Love Field (DAL) and Houston Intercontinental Airport (IAH).  In 1974, all TI flights at Tyler were being operated with Convair 600 turboprops with three weekday nonstops to Dallas/Fort Worth (DFW), as well as  direct service to Houston and Memphis.  In 1975, Texas International had competition to Dallas/Fort Worth as commuter air carrier Metroflight Airlines, a subsidiary of Metro Airlines, was operating seven nonstop de Havilland Canada DHC-6 Twin Otter flights to DFW, while TI had two nonstops with Convair 600s.  According to the February 1, 1976 Official Airline Guide, Texas International was operating direct Convair 600 service to Tyler from Austin, Houston (IAH), Midland/Odessa, Shreveport and Wichita Falls.  This OAG also lists nineteen weekday Metroflight Twin Otter flights being operated into Tyler, including nine nonstops from Dallas/Fort Worth (DFW), nine nonstops from Longview and one nonstop from Nacogdoches with this latter flight operating direct service from Houston (IAH) and Lufkin.

By 1978, Texas International had pulled out of Tyler.

In 1979, Metroflight Airlines was operating the only flights to Dallas/Fort Worth with nonstop de Havilland Canada DHC-6 Twin Otter and Short 330 service as well as direct Twin Otters to IAH via Longview and/or Nacogdoches.  By 1981, the airline was operating 12 weekday nonstops between Tyler and Dallas/Fort Worth with Short 330s and Twin Otters.  Metroflight became an American Eagle carrier operating code sharing flights for American Airlines, and in 1985 was continuing to operate Twin Otter service between Tyler and Dallas/Fort Worth International Airport. In 1985 Air Spirit, a commuter airline, flew Embraer EMB-110 Bandeirante turboprops nonstop to Austin as part of a Texarkana – Tyler – Austin route.

In 1989, competition had resumed on the Tyler-Dallas/Fort Worth route: American Eagle Saab 340s and Delta Connection Embraer EMB-110 Bandeirantes (operated by Atlantic Southeast Airlines (ASA) on behalf of Delta Air Lines). The Official Airline Guide lists fourteen weekday flights between Tyler and DFW.  By 1991 Delta Connection (ASA) Embraer EMB-120 Brasilias and EMB-110 Bandeirantes were flying to DFW.

In 1995, Continental Express was flying Embraer EMB-120 Brasilias to IAH with three weekday nonstops via a code-sharing agreement with Continental Airlines. By 1999 Continental Express had replaced this Brasilia service with smaller Beechcraft 1900Ds with four weekday nonstops.

In the mid-1990s, Conquest Airlines, a commuter airline, flew Fairchild Swearingen Metroliners nonstop to both Austin and San Antonio. Dallas Express Airlines, another commuter airline, was flying twin-engined Pipers nonstop from DAL.  By 2000, Austin Express, also a commuter airline, had replaced Conquest with nonstop Metroliners to Austin.

Denver, Colorado-based Frontier Airlines also offered flights from Tyler with Airbus A320 mainline jetliner service nonstop to Denver; these flights lasted from July 2019 to April 2020 with the A320 being the largest aircraft ever to operate scheduled passenger airline service from the airport.

Museum

The Historic Aviation Memorial Museum, an aviation museum located at the airport, rented and moved into the former Tyler passenger terminal that had been closed since 2002.  The museum has a number of military jet fighters on display among other exhibits, and also flies and maintains two Russian-manufactured MiG-17F jets based at the airport.

Facilities and aircraft
It has three asphalt runways:

For the 12-month period ending July 31, 2011, the airport had 48,677 aircraft operations, average 133 per day: 83% general aviation, 14% air taxi, 2% airline, and 1% military; 152 aircraft were then based at the airport: 60% single-engine, 22% jet, 16% multi-engine, and 2% helicopter.

Airline and destination

Passenger

American Eagle, the regional air carrier subsidiary of American Airlines subsidiary, operates Bombardier CRJ-700 regional jets on its nonstop flights to DFW with this American Eagle service from Tyler being operated by SkyWest Airlines.

Destinations map

Accidents and incidents
 July 13, 2017: Piper PA-31T Cheyenne owned by T-210 HOLDINGS LLC: The aircraft went down as it was leaving the airport, headed to Midland Airpark. It crashed a quarter-mile south of the airport, with two fatalities.

References

External links

 
 Historic Aviation Memorial Museum, official website
 Tyler Pounds Regional (TYR) at Texas DOT airport directory
 Aerial image as of January 1996 from USGS The National Map
 
 
 

Airports in Texas
Transportation in Smith County, Texas
Buildings and structures in Smith County, Texas
Airfields of the United States Army Air Forces in Texas